is an EP by Japanese singer/songwriter Chisato Moritaka, released on July 10, 1988 by Warner Pioneer. The EP is themed around summer, headlined by Moritaka's cover of Dionne Warwick's "Do You Know the Way to San Jose". While the album is packaged in a standard 12 cm CD case, the disc itself is an 8 cm mini CD.

The album peaked at No. 22 on Oricon's albums chart and sold over 24,000 copies.

Track listing

Personnel 
 Chisato Moritaka – vocals
 Takumi Yamamoto – vocals (1)
 Ken Shima – piano, keyboards, piano, backing vocals (1–3)
 Keiji Toriyama – synthesizer programming (2–3)
 Tomoaki Arima – synthesizer programming (4–5)
 Yukio Seto – guitar (3)
 Keiichi Ishibashu – bass (1)
 Kenji Takamizu – bass (2–3)
 Yuichi Togashiki – drums (1)
 Masahiro Yamazaki – drums (2–3)
 Shingo Kanno – percussion (2)
 Nana – backing vocals (4)

Charts

References

External links 
 
 
 

1988 albums
Chisato Moritaka albums
Japanese-language EPs
Warner Music Japan EPs